José Manuel González López (10 October 1917 – 24 July 1988) was a Spanish professional footballer who played as a defender.

Career
González started his career in Granada's squad in 1941. He made his professional debut on 28 September during a 1–1 draw at Los Cármenes with Celta. That was the first of thirteen appearances in his opening campaign, prior to eighty-two across the following three; the last finishing with relegation to the Segunda División. In that time, González scored for the first time in a 5–2 win versus Celta in April 1944. He stayed with Granada for three seasons in tier two, before departing in 1948 to play for Segunda División team Málaga. Twenty-eight appearances followed in season one as they won promotion to La Liga for 1949–50.

He subsequently featured fifty-six times in two La Liga campaigns. In 1952, González secured a move to Real Madrid. However, he made just one appearance for the club - on 17 February versus Real Sociedad. He soon left to rejoin Granada. He retired four seasons later, following one hundred matches in the Segunda División. In 1959, he was made manager of Granada. He left after two matches.

Personal life
González's son and namesake Manuel González was also a professional footballer. His grandson, Lucas Alcaraz, became a football manager in 1995.

Career statistics

Club

Managerial record

References

External links

1917 births
1988 deaths
Footballers from the Community of Madrid
Spanish footballers
Association football defenders
La Liga players
Segunda División players
Granada CF footballers
CD Málaga footballers
Real Madrid CF players
Granada CF managers
Spanish football managers